Louise Brough successfully defended her title, defeating Margaret duPont in the final, 6–1, 3–6, 6–1 to win the ladies' singles tennis title at the 1950 Wimbledon Championships.

Seeds

  Louise Brough (champion)
  Margaret duPont (final)
  Doris Hart (semifinals)
  Pat Todd (semifinals)
  Shirley Fry (quarterfinals)
  Betty Harrison (quarterfinals)
  Gussie Moran (quarterfinals)
  Annalisa Bossi (first round)

Draw

Finals

Top half

Section 1

Section 2

Section 3

Section 4

Bottom half

Section 5

Section 6

Section 7

Section 8

References

External links

Women's Singles
Wimbledon Championship by year – Women's singles
Wimbledon Championships
Wimbledon Championships